Ron Stehouwer (February 4, 1937 – January 18, 2007) was an American football guard. He played for the Pittsburgh Steelers from 1960 to 1964.

He died on January 18, 2007, in San Antonio, Texas at age 69.

References

1937 births
2007 deaths
American football guards
Colorado State Rams football players
Pittsburgh Steelers players